Paul Montgomery Churchland (born October 21, 1942) is a Canadian philosopher known for his studies in neurophilosophy and the philosophy of mind. After earning a Ph.D. from the University of Pittsburgh under Wilfrid Sellars (1969), Churchland rose to the rank of full professor at the University of Manitoba before accepting the Valtz Family Endowed Chair in Philosophy at the University of California, San Diego (UCSD) and joint appointments in that institution's Institute for Neural Computation and on its Cognitive Science Faculty.

As of February 2017, Churchland is recognised as Professor Emeritus at the UCSD, and is a member of the Board of Trustees of the Moscow Center for Consciousness Studies of Moscow State University. Churchland is the husband of philosopher Patricia Churchland, with whom he collaborates, and The New Yorker has reported the similarity of their views, e.g., on the mind-body problem, are such that the two are often discussed as if they are one person.

Early life and education
Paul Montgomery Churchland was born in Vancouver, British Columbia, Canada, on October 21, 1942. Growing up in Vancouver, Churchland's father was a high school science teacher and his mother took in sewing. As a boy, he was obsessed with science fiction; he was particularly struck by the ideas in Robert A. Heinlein's Orphans of the Sky. Churchland liked building things in his father's woodworking and metal shop in their basement, and expected to become an aerodynamical engineer.

At the University of British Columbia, Churchland began with classes in math and physics, intending to pursue engineering. Conversations with fellow students in the summer before his sophomore year inspired him to begin taking philosophy classes. He graduated with a Bachelor of Arts in 1964

He earned his Ph.D. from the University of Pittsburgh in 1969, his dissertation entitled "Persons and P-Predicates" written with Wilfrid Sellars as his advisor.

Career
Churchland lectured at the University of Toronto from 1967–69, and began his independent professional career as an instructor at the University of Pittsburgh in 1969. In 1969, Churchland took a position at the University of Manitoba, where he would teach for fifteen years: as an assistant professor (1969–74) and associate professor (1974–79), and then, from 1979–1984, as a full professor. He spent a year at the Institute for Advanced Study in Princeton, and joined the faculty at the University of California, San Diego in 1984. There, he served as Department Chair from 1986–1990.

As of this February 2017, Churchland is recognised as Professor Emeritus at the University of California, San Diego, where he earlier held the Valtz Family Endowed Chair in Philosophy (through 2011), and continues to appear as a philosophy faculty member on the UCSD Interdisciplinary Ph.D. Program in Cognitive Science and with the affiliated faculty of the UCSD Institute for Neural Computation. As of February 2017, he is also a member of the Board of Trustees of the Center for Consciousness Studies of the Philosophy Department, Moscow State University.

Philosophical work

Churchland's work is in the school of analytic philosophy in western philosophy, with interests in epistemology and the philosophy of science, and specific principal interests in the philosophy of mind and in neurophilosophy and artificial intelligence. His work has been described as being influenced by the work of W. V. O. Quine, Thomas Kuhn, Russell Hanson, Wilfrid Sellars, and Paul Feyerabend.

Along with his wife, Churchland is a major proponent of eliminative materialism, the belief that 
where by folk psychology is meant everyday mental concepts such as beliefs, feelings, and desires, which are viewed as theoretical constructs without coherent definition, and thus destined to be obviated by a scientific understanding of human nature. From the perspective of Zawidzki, Churchland's concept of eliminativism is suggested as early as his book Scientific Realism and the Plasticity of Mind (1979), with its most explicit formulation appearing in a Journal of Philosophy essay, "Eliminative Materialism and the Propositional Attitudes" (1981, see #Written works section below).

Churchland believes that beliefs are not ontologically real; that is, he believes that a future, fully matured neuroscience is likely to have no need for "beliefs" (see propositional attitudes), in the same manner that modern science discarded such notions as legends or witchcraft. According to Churchland, such concepts will not merely be reduced to more finely grained explanation and retained as useful proximate levels of description, but will be strictly eliminated as wholly lacking in correspondence to precise objective phenomena, such as activation patterns across neural networks. He points out that the history of science has seen many posits that were considered as real entities: such as phlogiston; caloric; the luminiferous ether; and vital forces that were thus eliminated.

Moreover, in The Engine of Reason, The Seat of the Soul Churchland asserts his belief that consciousness might be explained in terms of a recurrent neural network with its hub in the intralaminar nucleus of the thalamus, and feedback connections to all parts of the cortex. He acknowledges that this proposal will likely be found in error with regard to the neurological details, but states his belief that it is on the right track in its use of recurrent neural networks to account for consciousness. This has been described, notably, as a reductionist rather than eliminativist account of consciousness.

Personal life
Churchland is the husband of philosopher Patricia Churchland, and it has been noted that, "Their work is so similar that they are sometimes discussed, in journals and books, as one person."

The Churchlands are the parents of two children, Mark Churchland and Anne Churchland, both of whom are neuroscientists.

Written works

Popular writing
 [subscription required]

Scholarly work

Books
Professor Churchland has authored several books in philosophy, which have been translated into many languages. His works are as follows:

 
 
 
 
 
 
 
 

His book Matter and Consciousness has been frequently and extensively reprinted. Both Scientific Realism and the Plasticity of Mind and A Neurocomputational Perspective have also been reprinted.

Essays
Professor Churchland has written a number of published articles, some of which have been translated into other languages, including several that have had a substantial impact in philosophy. Essays which have been reprinted include:

  See also the PDF version at K. A. Akins' web pages at Simon Fraser University.

See also
 American philosophy
 List of American philosophers
 List of Canadian philosophers

References

Further reading
 
  The volume includes critical chapters from editor McCauley, Patricia Kitcher, Andy Clark, William G. Lycan, William Bechtel, Jerry Fodor and Ernie Lapore, Antonio R. Damasio and Hanna Damasio, John Marshall and Jennifer Gurd, and Owen Flanagan. These are then followed by a 94 pp. essay in response, by Paul Churchland and Patricia Churchland (hence the Churchlands are both the subject of and in part authors of this volume).

External links

 Churchland's UCSD homepage
 Center for Consciousness Studies of the Philosophy Department, Moscow State University
 "From the Engine of Reason to the Seat of the Soul," The Science Network interview with the Churchlands
 Moscow Center For Consciousness Studies interview with Churchland

1942 births
Living people
20th-century American philosophers
Analytic philosophers
Canadian philosophers
Epistemologists
Materialists
Philosophers of mind
University of California, San Diego faculty
21st-century American philosophers
University of Pittsburgh alumni
Academic staff of the University of Toronto
People from Vancouver
Presidents of the American Philosophical Association